New Hope (also called Fenwick Mountain) is an unincorporated community in Nicholas County in the U.S. state of West Virginia. New Hope lies between the communities of Fenwick and Nettie along West Virginia Routes 20 and 39. New Hope is also the location of nearby Richwood's municipal airport. Fenwick Mountain has three churches, New Hope Baptist Church, the Macedonia United Methodist Church and the Revival Center. Fenwick Mountain is predominantly a Christian community based on the timber and coal mining industries.  Fenwick Mountain also has a Community Center which was converted from the old New Hope Elementary School. The New Hope Community also known as Fenwick Mountain receives its water supply from neighboring city of Richwood. Fenwick Mountain is also home of the famous Spencer Lumber Company.

References

Census-designated places in Nicholas County, West Virginia